Meme IDE is a software platform for developing mobile applications.

Meme IDE is developed by Meme Apps and was introduced in May 2011 as a beta version still under development.

The beta release allowed mobile developers to build applications for Windows Mobile 6.5 and Android 2.1+ and is still currently in beta.  Meme Apps state that the iOS platform will be added in the full release with plans also intended for the inclusion of BlackBerry.

Meme IDE is one of several cross platform integrated development environments allowing application developers to build and develop applications for Windows Mobile 6.5, Android and iPhone based around an Eclipse framework.  Where Meme IDE differs is in its programming language, MemeScript. A language constructed of elements of other main programming languages C#, C++ and Java.

Mobile compilation is subject to additional requirements: iPhone builds require Mac OS X and the iOS SDK, and Android builds require the Android SDK and Mac, Windows, or Linux.

Meme Apps also offers cloud-based services for packaging, testing and distributing software applications developed on the Meme IDE platform  And Meme Apps states that these will become available in the products full release at the end of the beta period along with business support options.

In partnership with Momote Ltd, Meme Apps was founded in 2010.

References

<references 

Integrated development environments